This article is about 1933 United States Federal legislation that limited the interaction of commercial and investment banking. It analyzes the content of four sections of the Banking Act of 1933, which came to be known as "Glass-Steagall," and describes the content of the legislative text and its limits/loopholes.

For broader coverage of Glass-Steagall, including its history, similar legislation, regulatory and industry reactions, and repeal, see the main article, Glass–Steagall Act. For full coverage of the 1933 Banking Act, see the main article, Banking Act of 1933.

The Glass–Steagall provisions separating commercial and investment banking

The Glass–Steagall separation of commercial and investment banking was in four sections of the 1933 Banking Act (sections 16, 20, 21, and 32).

Section 16
Section 16 prohibited national banks from purchasing or selling securities except for a customer's account (i.e., as a customer's agent) unless the securities were purchased for the bank's account as "investment securities" identified by the Comptroller of the Currency as permitted national bank investments.  Section 16 also prohibited national banks from underwriting or distributing securities.

Section 16, however, permitted national banks to buy, sell, underwrite, and distribute US government and general obligation state and local government securities.  Such securities became known as "bank-eligible securities."

Section 5(c) of the 1933 Banking Act (sometimes referred to as the fifth Glass–Steagall provision) applied Section 16's rules to Federal Reserve System member state chartered banks.

Section 20
Section 20 prohibited any member bank of the Federal Reserve System (whether a state chartered or national bank) from being affiliated with a company that "engaged principally" in "the issue, flotation, underwriting, public sale, or distribution" of securities.

Section 21
Section 21 prohibited any company or person from taking deposits if it was in the business of "issuing, underwriting, selling, or distributing" securities.

Section 32
Section 32 prohibited any Federal Reserve System member bank from having any officer or director in common with a company "engaged primarily" in the business of "purchasing, selling, or negotiating" securities, unless the Federal Reserve Board granted an exemption.

1935 clarifying amendments
Sections 16 and 21 contradicted each other.  The Banking Act of 1935 "clarified" that Section 21 would not prevent a deposit taking company from engaging in any of the securities underwriting and dealing activities permitted by Section 16.  It also amended Section 16 to permit a bank to purchase stocks, not only debt securities, for a customer's account.

The Banking Act of 1935 amended Section 32 to make it consistent with Section 20 and to prevent a securities company and bank from having any employee (not only any officer) in common.  With the amendment, both Sections 20 and 32 applied to companies engaged in the "issue, flotation, underwriting, public sale, or distribution" of securities.

Prohibitions apply to dealing in and underwriting or distributing securities
The Glass–Steagall Act was primarily directed at restricting banks and their affiliates underwriting or distributing securities.  Senator Glass, Representative Steagall, Ferdinand Pecora, and others claimed banks had abused this activity to sell customers (including correspondent banks) high risk securities. As particular "conflicts of interest," they alleged bank affiliates had underwritten corporate and foreign government bonds to repay loans made by their affiliated banks or, in the opposite direction, banks had lent to or otherwise supported corporations that used the bank's affiliate to underwrite their bonds.

Sections 16 and 5(c) meant no member bank of the Federal Reserve System could underwrite or distribute corporate or other non-governmental bonds. Sections 20 and 32 meant such a bank could not own (directly or through the same bank holding company) a company "engaged primarily in" such underwriting or other securities activities nor have any director or employee that was also a director or employee of such a company.

Senator Glass, Representative Steagall, and others claimed banks had made too many loans for securities speculation and too many direct bank investments in securities. As described in the article on the Banking Act of 1933, non-"Glass–Steagall" provisions of the 1933 Banking Act restricted those activities. Among the Glass–Steagall provisions, Sections 16 and 5(c) prevented a Federal Reserve member bank from investing in equity securities or from "dealing" in debt securities as a market maker or otherwise.  Section 16 permitted national banks (and Section 5(c) permitted state member banks) to purchase for their own accounts "marketable" debt securities that were "investment securities" approved by the Comptroller of the Currency.  The Comptroller interpreted this to mean marketable securities rated "investment grade" by the rating agencies or, if not rated, a security that is the "credit equivalent."

Even before Glass–Steagall, however, national banks had been prohibited from investing in equity securities and could only purchase as investments debt securities approved by the Comptroller.  Section 16's major change was (through the Comptroller's interpretation) to limit the investments to "investment grade" debt and to repeal the McFadden Act permission for national banks to act as "dealers" in buying and selling debt securities.  Section 5(c) applied these national bank restrictions to state chartered banks that were members of the Federal Reserve System.

The Comptroller ruled national banks could "trade" investment securities they had purchased, based on a bank's power to sell its assets, so long as this trading did not cause the bank to be a "dealer". Section 16 itself required banks to purchase only "marketable" securities, so that it contemplated (and required) that the securities be traded in a liquid market.  The Office of the Comptroller, like the Securities and Exchange Commission, distinguished between a "trader" and a "dealer". A "trader" buys and sells securities "opportunistically" based on when it thinks prices are low or high.  A "dealer" buys and sells securities with customers to provide "liquidity" or otherwise provides buy and sell prices "on a continuous basis" as a market maker or otherwise. The Comptroller of the Currency, therefore, ruled that Section 16 permitted national banks to engage in "proprietary trading" of "investment securities" for which it could not act as a "dealer". Thus, Glass–Steagall permitted "banks to invest in and trade securities to a significant extent" and did not restrict trading by bank affiliates, although the Bank Holding Company Act did restrict investments by bank affiliates.

None of these prohibitions applied to "bank-eligible securities" (i.e., US government and state general obligation securities).  Banks were free to underwrite, distribute, and deal in such securities.

Glass–Steagall "loopholes"

Except for Section 21, Glass–Steagall only covered Federal Reserve member commercial banks
As explained in the article on the Banking Act of 1933, if the 1933 Banking Act had not been amended, it would have required all federally insured banks to become members of the Federal Reserve System. Instead, because that requirement was removed through later legislation, the United States retained a dual banking system in which a large number of state chartered banks remained outside the Federal Reserve System. This meant they were also outside the restrictions of Sections 16, 20, and 32 of the Glass–Steagall Act. As described below, this became important in the 1980s when commentators worried large commercial banks would leave the Federal Reserve System to avoid Glass–Steagall's affiliation restrictions.

Although Section 21 of the Glass–Steagall Act was directed at preventing securities firms (particularly traditional private partnerships such as J.P. Morgan & Co.) from accepting deposits, it prevented any firm that accepted deposits from underwriting or dealing in securities (other than "bank-eligible securities" after the 1935 Banking Act's "clarification").  This meant Section 21, unlike the rest of Glass–Steagall, applied to savings and loans and other "thrifts," state nonmember banks, and any other firm or individual in the business of taking deposits. This prevented such "depository institutions" from being securities firms.  It did not prevent securities firms, such as Merrill Lynch, from owning separate subsidiaries that were thrifts or state chartered, non-Federal Reserve member banks. As described below, this became important when securities firms used "unitary thrifts" and "nonbank banks" to avoid both Glass–Steagall affiliation restrictions and holding company laws that generally limited bank holding companies to banking businesses and savings and loan holding companies to thrift businesses.

Different treatment of bank and affiliate activities
Section 21 was not the only Glass–Steagall provision that treated differently what a company could do directly and what it could do through a subsidiary or other affiliate.  As described in the Banking Act of 1933 article, Senator Glass and other proponents of separating commercial banks from investment banking attacked the artificiality of distinguishing between banks and their securities affiliates. Sections 20 and 32 of the Glass–Steagall Act, however, distinguished between what a bank could do directly and what an affiliated company could do.

No bank covered by Section 16's prohibitions could buy, sell, underwrite, or distribute any security except as specifically permitted by Section 16. Under Section 21, no securities firm (understood as a firm "in the business" of underwriting, distributing, or dealing in securities) could accept any deposit.

Glass–Steagall's affiliation provisions did not contain such absolute prohibitions.  Section 20 only prohibited a bank from affiliating with a firm "engaged principally" in underwriting, distributing, or dealing in securities.  Under Section 32, a bank could not share employees or directors with a company "primarily engaged" in underwriting, distributing, or dealing in securities.

This difference (which would later be termed a "loophole") provided the justification for the "long demise of Glass–Steagall" through regulatory actions that largely negated the practical significance of Sections 20 and 32 before they were repealed by the GLBA. The fact Sections 16, 20, and 32 only restricted Federal Reserve member banks was another feature that made the Glass–Steagall Act less than "comprehensive" and, in the words of a 1987 commentator, provided "opportunities for banking institutions and their lawyers to explore (or, perhaps more accurately, to exploit)."

References

Works cited

 
 .
 .
 .
 .

1933 in American law
73rd United States Congress
Federal Deposit Insurance Corporation
United States federal banking legislation
Repealed United States legislation
Financial regulation in the United States
Separation of investment and retail banking